Christian Verougstraete (born 11 September 1950 is a Belgian politician who served on the Flemish Parliament from 1995 to 2014.

A native of Uccle, he was born on 11 September 1950 and attended Our Lady College, Antwerp. He would later study law in University. He was a member of the Flemish Parliament from 1995 to 2014, representing Veurne-Diksmuide-Ostend-Ypres from 1995 to 2003 on behalf of the Vlaams Blok. Between 2004 and 2014, Verougstraete served West Flanders and was affiliated with Vlaams Belang. Verougstraete's wife Frieda Deschacht was elected to the Flemish Parliament in her own right in 2019.

References

1950 births
Living people
Members of the Flemish Parliament
20th-century Belgian politicians
Vlaams Belang politicians
21st-century Belgian politicians
People from Uccle